This is a timeline of the Republic of China.

Timeline when controlled Chinese mainland (1912–1949)

1911–1920

1911: Wuchang Uprising.
1911: Flag of the Republic of China "Five-Colored Flag" selected as the national flag by the provisional senate.
1912: Sun Yat-sen elected First Provisional President of the ROC by delegates from independent provinces.
1912: Last emperor of China Puyi forced to abdicate, Yuan Shikai became president.
1915: Twenty-One Demands.
1916: Yuan Shikai dies.
1917: Manchu Restoration to restore monarchy in China by General Zhang Xun.
1919: Treaty of Versailles is established.
1919: May Fourth Movement.

1921–1930
1921: Beiyang government lost control of Outer Mongolia.
1924: Whampoa Military Academy established.
1925: Sun Yat-sen dies, National Revolutionary Army founded.
1926: beginning of the Northern Expedition.
1927: Shanghai massacre, beginning of the Chinese Civil War.
1928: end of the Northern Expedition, Flag of the Republic of China "Blue Sky, White Sun, and a Wholly Red Earth" flag adopted as the nation's official flag.

1931–1940

1930: Central Plains War broke out.
1931: Japanese invasion of Manchuria.
1932: Pacification of Manchukuo.
1933: Defense of the Great Wall.
1936: Xi'an Incident, Chiang Kai-shek was detained by his subordinates Zhang Xueliang and Yang Hucheng.
1937: Marco Polo Bridge Incident, mass start of Second Sino-Japanese War .

1941–1950
1943: USA repeals the Chinese Exclusion Act.
1945: Republic of China begins administrating Taiwan.  Per treaty, the United States of America is the principal occupying power and the ROC/KMT is a subordinate occupying power. 
1945: Sino-Soviet Treaty of Friendship and Alliance.
1946: Second Kuomintang-Communist Civil War begins.
1948: Universal Declaration of Human Rights adopted by the United Nations General Assembly. P. C. Chang is among its authors.
1949:  On 1 October 1949, Chinese Communist leader Mao Zedong declares the creation of the People’s Republic of China (PRC), which considers itself to have officially overtaken the ROC, and considers China to have become the PRC. The ROC central government relocates to Taiwan. (The announcement ended the costly full-scale civil war between the Chinese Communist Party (CCP) and the Nationalist Party, or Kuomintang (KMT), which broke out immediately following World War II and had been preceded by on and off a conflict between the two sides since the 1920s.)

Timeline when only controls Taiwan (after 1949)

1951–1960
1952: San Francisco Peace Treaty comes into force.  Japan renounces all right, title, and claim to Taiwan, but no "receiving country" is designated. The ROC claims to have formally acquired the territorial sovereignty over Taiwan and Penghu through peace treaties with Japan.
1952: Treaty of Taipei comes into force.  Article 2 recognizes the disposition of Taiwan as specified in the San Francisco Peace Treaty.
1955: Mutual Defense Treaty with the United States comes into force.   Article 6 recognizes the effective territorial control of the ROC over Taiwan.
1960: US President Dwight Eisenhower visited Taiwan.

1961–1970
1964: Shimen Dam, largest in Taiwan at the time, was completed.

1971–1980
1973: Zengwun Dam was completed.
1974: Techi Dam was completed.

1981–1990
1984: Junghua Dam was completed.
1986: Opposition political parties were allowed.
1987: Martial law was lifted.
1988: The restriction on newspapers was lifted.

1991–2000
1992: South Korea recognized People's Republic of China, severing ties with the Republic of China.
1995: The People's Republic of China test fired missiles to waters within 60 kilometers of Taiwan, followed by live fire military exercises, in an attempt to sway election results.
1996: The first direct vote election was held for the office of the President of the Republic of China.  People's Republic of China again fired missiles near Taiwan in an act of intimidation.
 1999: Construction began on Taipei 101, which was to be the tallest building in the world.

2001–2010
 2004: Taipei 101, the tallest building in the world until 2011, was completed.
 2004 : National Highway No. 3 Formosa Freeway traffic
 2004 : The first 11 presidential election : Vote three hundred nineteen before the shooting incident, Chen Shui-bian and Annette Lu was           
elected by a narrow majority
 2004 : Lien Chan and James Soong proposed election invalid election invalid complaints and appeal, the Court conducted a nationwide recount
 2004 : Jiang Fangliang death
 2004 : Taekwondo athlete Chen Shih-hsin at the Athens Olympic Games first gold medal for Chinese Taipei
 2004 : The 6th legislative elections : the Democratic Progressive Party 89 seats, 79 seats Kuomintang, the People First Party 34 seats, 12 seats TSU, New Party one seat, no party coalition six seats, independents four seats
 2004 : Kun Kun Cabinet resignation, took over as Premier Frank Hsieh
 2005 : Chinese New Year cross-strait charter flights, separated 56 years later, the Civil Aviation charter flight landed in Taiwan in mainland China for the first time legally
 2005 : The People's Republic of China through the anti-secession law, Taiwan's DPP government held three large protest Protect Taiwan 2696
 2005 : Lien Chan and James Soong have access to mainland China journey of peace, bridge tour
 2005 : Task-based National Assembly elections, the National Assembly convenes after the repeal, lawmakers seats halved in the Constitution referendum proposal
 2005 : Ma Ying-jeou was elected chairman of the Chinese Kuomintang
 2005 : Kaohsiung MRT scandal of foreign workers
 2005 : Heads county elections: KMT 14 seats, the Democratic Progressive Party six seats, the New Party one seat, no party a seat
 2006 : Hsieh Cabinet resignation, took over as Premier Su Tseng-chang
 2006 : Sun Yun-suan death
 2006 : a gift from the Chinese mainland declined panda
 2006 : the abolition of the National Unification Guidelines
 2006 : Taiwan to open the case, the case of minors Legislature presidential recall vote
 2006 : Snow Mountain Crossing
 2006 : Shih leadership "a million people fell flat anti- corruption " campaign
 2006 : state affairs fund corruption charges against Wu Shu-chen, President Chen Shui-bian announced the resignation of First Instance found guilty
 2006 : Academy Award for Best Director Ang Lee
 2006 : The 10th municipality CEO and City Council elections : Taipei Mayor Hau Lung-bin elected ; Kaohsiung Mayor Chen Chu was elected ; Soong announced his withdrawal from politics Chu
 2006 : Wang record 19 wins in MLB single-season record
 2006 : Taiwan High Speed Rail trial operation next year on January 5 traffic
 2007 : Special charges of corruption charges against Ma Ying-jeou, KMT Chairman Ma resigned from China
 2007 : Elected Chinese Kuomintang Chairman Wu Poh-hsiung
 2007 : Denial Beijing Olympic torch through Taipei to Hong Kong route
 2007 : Local Government Act to modify, Taipei County became quasi- municipality
 2007 : Frank Hsieh, the DPP and the KMT nominated Ma Ying-jeou presidential election race
 2007 : the resignation of Premier Su Tseng-chang, the SEF chairman, former Premier Chang Chun-hsiung skillet take office.
 2007 : 17 whole generation of Chinese Kuomintang Ma Ying-jeou will be nominated by, Siew compete partner and vice presidential candidate in 2008 elections.
 2008: The Republic of the seventh legislative election case cum third and fourth cases nationwide referendum : the Chinese Nationalist Party won a landslide victory, get 81 seats, the Democratic Progressive Party obtained 27 seats, the Non-Partisan Solidarity Union 3 seats, the People First Party 1 seat, no party a seat, while the third case of a referendum, by the fourth case were no
A gift from the Chinese mainland to Taiwan pandas
 2008: The 12th president of the vice presidential election case cum fifth and sixth cases nationwide referendum : Ma, Siew was elected to 7,658,724 votes, 58.45 percent votes, Frank Hsieh, Su Tseng-chang 5,445,239 votes, 41.55 percent votes, while the referendum fifth case, 6 cases were by no
 2008 : Taiwan's Tsai Ing-wen was elected as the first female major political parties in the party chairman
 2008 : Soyuz fishing boat incident : June 10 Japanese patrol boats fishing boat sank ROC " United", and the boat people taken to Japan interrogation, the crew back the next day, but the captain detained June 12 due to the pressure Republic of China, Japan, the release of the captain. June 13 ROC Premier Liu said the Japanese side will eventually be more force to resolve the Diaoyu Islands dispute.
 2008 : SEF, ARATS again to resume talks on June 13, the two sides are expected to solve the current predicament. The talks have signed cross-strait weekend charter flights and mainland residents to travel two agreements.
 2009 : Typhoon Morakot caused by Typhoon Morakot, the first time the ROC government refused foreign aid
 2009 : Taiwan President Chen Shui-bian and his wife Wu Shu-chen ago was sentenced to life imprisonment.
 2010 : The Legislative Yuan passed the "Executive Yuan Organization Law" amendment, Executive Yuan central administrative authorities since 1 January 2012 will be reduced from 37 to 27 ministries Ministry, 2 OFFICE.
 2010: ECFA was signed.
 2010 : Tainan, Kaohsiung and Taichung counties were upgraded to merge the three municipalities, Taipei County was upgraded to an independent municipality – New Taipei City.

from 2011
 2011 : Tsai Ing-wen was elected as the first female presidential candidate
 2011 : Republic of China a hundred years.
 2012 : The first 13 presidential election, Vice President, Ma Ying-jeou, Wu Den-yih was elected to 6,891,139 votes, 51.60 percent votes, Tsai Ing-wen, Su Jia 6,093,578 votes, 45.63 percent votes, James Soong, Ruey S. Lin 369,588 votes, the vote by 2.77%. 8th legislative elections, the KMT 64 seats, the DPP 40 seats, the People First Party 3 seats, 3 seats TSU, no party coalition two seats, one seat without party affiliation.
 2013 : Academy Award for Best Director Ang Lee re-
 2013 : Taiwan and Japan signed the " Taiwan-Japan Fisheries Agreement " at the Taipei Guest House, the two countries share overlapping EEZ fishery resources.
 2013 : The Department of Health into history, was upgraded to the Ministry of Health and Welfare. (Institute of Medicine in the Department of Education and the Executive Yuan disability benefits ............ sectors combined )
 2013 : Taiwan New Zealand Economic Cooperation Agreement (ANZTEC), Taiwan Star Economic Cooperation Agreement (ASTEP) officially signed.

See also
 Timeline of Chinese history
 Timeline of Taiwanese history
 History of the Republic of China

Chinese history timelines
Taiwan history-related lists
Republic of China